The 2021 FIVB Volleyball Men's Nations League was the third edition of the FIVB Volleyball Men's Nations League, an annual men's international volleyball tournament. The 2021 version of VNL was scheduled to start earlier than the previous edition due to the 2020 Summer Olympics in July. The competition was held between May and June 2021, and the final round took place in Rimini Fiera, Rimini, Italy.

Brazil claimed their first VNL title after beating Poland in four sets. France swept Slovenia in three sets and grabbed the bronze medal. Both Wallace de Souza from Brazil and Bartosz Kurek from Poland named as MVPs of the tournament.

Qualification
In the 2019 edition sixteen teams qualified for the competition. Twelve of them qualified as core teams which could not face relegation. Other four teams were selected as challenger teams which could be relegated from the tournament. Slovenia as winner of 2019 Challenger Cup earned the right to participate in this tournament replacing Portugal, the last placed challenger team after the 2019 edition. This year there won’t be any promotion or relegation and the 16 participants will also compete in the 2022 edition.

Netherlands replaced China after the decision of the Chinese Volleyball Association to withdraw its national men's team due to financial limitations and travel restrictions caused by the COVID-19 pandemic.

Format

Preliminary round
The 16 teams compete in a round-robin format. The teams play 3 matches each week and compete five weeks long, for 120 matches. The top four teams after the preliminary round compete in the final round.

Final round
The four qualified teams play knock-out round. The semifinals winners advance to compete for the Nations League title. The losers face each other in the third place match.

Secure bubble
As to ensure athletes were able to compete and the games were conducted safely, the 2021 VNL was played under a secure bubble. After the game, a total of 2,250 PCR and 7,920 antigen tests were performed and only one registered COVID-19 case was found.

Venue

Competition schedule

Pool standing procedure
 Total number of victories (matches won, matches lost)
 In the event of a tie, the following first tiebreaker will apply: The teams will be ranked by the most points gained per match as follows:
Match won 3–0 or 3–1: 3 points for the winner, 0 points for the loser
Match won 3–2: 2 points for the winner, 1 point for the loser
Match forfeited: 3 points for the winner, 0 points (0–25, 0–25, 0–25) for the loser
 If teams are still tied after examining the number of victories and points gained, then the FIVB will examine the results in order to break the tie in the following order:
Sets quotient: if two or more teams are tied on the number of points gained, they will be ranked by the quotient resulting from the division of the number of all sets won by the number of all sets lost.
Points quotient: if the tie persists based on the sets quotient, the teams will be ranked by the quotient resulting from the division of all points scored by the total of points lost during all sets.
If the tie persists based on the points quotient, the tie will be broken based on the team that won the match of the Round Robin Phase between the tied teams. When the tie in points quotient is between three or more teams, these teams ranked taking into consideration only the matches involving the teams in question.

Squads

The 16 national teams involved in the tournament were required to register a squad of 25 players, which every week's 14-player roster must be selected from. Each country must declare its 14-player roster two days before the start of each week's round-robin competition.

Preliminary round
All times are Central European Summer Time (UTC+02:00).

Ranking

|}
Source: VNL 2021 standings

Week 1
|}

Week 2
|}

Week 3
|}

Week 4
|}

Week 5
|}

Final round
All times are Central European Summer Time (UTC+02:00).

Semifinals
|}

Third place match
|}

Final
|}

Final standing

Source: VNL 2021 final standings

Awards

Most Valuable Players

Best Setter

Best Outside Spikers

Best Middle Blockers

Best Opposite Spikers

Best Libero

Statistics leaders

Preliminary round
Statistics leaders correct as of preliminary round.

Final round
Statistics leaders correct as of final round.

COVID related
Because of COVID-19 restrictions, the games were played without spectators. A total of 10,170 COVID-19 tests (including women's side) were conducted to players, referees, officials and staff every four days.

See also
2021 FIVB Volleyball Women's Nations League
2019 FIVB Volleyball Men's Challenger Cup
2019 FIVB Volleyball Women's Challenger Cup

Notes

References

External links
Fédération Internationale de Volleyball – official website
FIVB Volleyball Nations League 2021 – official website

2021
FIVB
FIVB Volleyball Men's Nations League
FIVB
FIVB
FIVB
International men's volleyball competitions hosted by Italy